The capitalist state  is the state, its functions and the form of organization it takes within capitalist socioeconomic systems. This concept is often used interchangeably with the concept of the modern state, though despite their common functions there are many recognized differences in sociological characteristics among capitalist states.

The primary functions of the capitalist state are to provide a legal framework and infrastructural framework conducive to business enterprise and the accumulation of capital. Different normative theories exist on the necessary and appropriate function of the state in a capitalist economy, with proponents of laissez-faire favoring a state limited to the provision of public goods and safeguarding private property rights while proponents of interventionism stress the importance of regulation, intervention and macroeconomic stabilization for providing a favorable environment for the accumulation of capital and business. 

Thus, thinkers in the Marxist tradition often refer to the capitalist state as the dictatorship of the bourgeoisie. Thinkers in the instrumental Marxist tradition stress the role of policymakers and political elites sharing a common business or class background, leading to their decisions reflecting their class interest. This is differentiated from more contemporary notions of state capture by specific business interests for the benefit of those specific businesses and not the ruling class or capitalist system as a whole, which is variously referred to as crony capitalism or corporatocracy.

According to Dylan John Riley, Nicos Poulantzas argued that "all capitalist States had the dual task of preventing the political organization of the dominated classes, and of organizing the dominant class".

See also 
 Big government
 Capital accumulation
 Capitalism
 Capitalist mode of production
 Communist state
 Corporatocracy
 Economic interventionism
 Liberal democracy
 Socialist state
 Sovereign state
 State capitalism

References

Citations

Bibliography

Further reading 

 Barak, Gregg (ed.) (1991). Crimes by the Capitalist State: An Introduction to State Criminality. Albany, New York: State University of New York Press. .
 Duncan, Graeme. Democracy and the Capitalist State. New York: Cambridge University Press. .
 Jessop, Bob (2002). The Future of the Capitalist State. Cambridge: Polity Press. .
 Jessop, Bob (1990). State Theory: Putting the Capitalist State in its Place. University Park: Pennsylvania State University Press. .
 Saville, John (1994). The Consolidation of the Capitalist State, 1800-1850. London and Boulder, Colorado: Pluto Press. .
 Szymanski, Albert (1978). The Capitalist State and the Politics of Class. Cambridge, Massachusetts: Winthrop Publishers. .

Capitalism
Forms of government
Political science terminology
Marxist terminology